Zunongwangia mangrovi is a Gram-negative, rod-shaped, strictly aerobic, slightly halophilic and non-motile bacterium from the genus of Zunongwangia which has been isolated from the mangrove Avicennia marina from Tamil Nadu.

References

Flavobacteria
Bacteria described in 2014